"Frame Toby" is the ninth episode of the fifth season of the television series The Office, and the show's eighty-first episode overall. The episode aired in the United States on November 20, 2008, on NBC.

On November 25, 2008, a producer's cut of "Frame Toby" was posted on NBC.com. This cut ran approximately four minutes longer than the original airing. After nearly a two-year absence, this is the first producer's cut since season three's "The Return".

In this episode, Michael has trouble accepting the fact that his least favorite employee, HR rep Toby, has returned to the office and enlists Dwight's help to frame him for using drugs so he will be fired. Meanwhile, Pam is disgusted over a mess left in the microwave that no one bothers to clean up, and Jim buys his parents' house – without telling Pam.

Michael's outburst when he discovers that Toby has returned became an internet meme after the episode aired. Scream 2 was mentioned in the episode, with the character Michael Scott saying how much he loved it and drawing parallels to his life and that of the movie's heroine, Sidney Prescott.

Synopsis
Michael Scott (Steve Carell) learns that Toby Flenderson (Paul Lieberstein) is back as their HR representative and reacts very badly to it. He tries to get CFO David Wallace (Andy Buckley) to get rid of Toby, but David refuses. Michael tries to pretend to be friends with Toby, but finds himself unable to do so. Michael and Dwight Schrute (Rainn Wilson) attempt to set Toby up for sexual harassment by using Pam Beesly (Jenna Fischer) as bait, but Pam defuses the scheme. Michael tries to provoke Toby into punching him, which proves fruitless. Finally, Michael decides to plant drugs in Toby's desk, and purchases what he believes to be marijuana for $500 from two Vance Refrigeration employees. Dwight calls the police, who arrive shortly afterward. Dwight leads the police to Toby's desk, which the police search. Michael, starting to feel guilty, tries to take the blame, but the police discover that the planted "marijuana" is really a bag of Caprese salad. After the police leave, Toby scolds Michael for wasting the cops' time when they could have been catching real criminals. Michael is disgusted that Toby is more worried about the cops' time than about being framed, and hates Toby more than ever.

Pam finds a mess in the microwave, and writes an anonymous memo telling everyone to keep it clean. Her coworkers consider the note snobbish – except for Angela Martin (Angela Kinsey), and Ryan Howard (B. J. Novak), who unsuccessfully tries to feign incompetence to manipulate Pam into cleaning it. Ryan later tells Kelly (Mindy Kaling) that they have to break up, saying he is going on a trip to Thailand, before asking for sex one last time and for any extra cash she has.

Jim Halpert (John Krasinski) bought his parents' house without asking Pam. Reviewing the house, Jim takes note of the shag carpeting and an ugly painting which is apparently built into the wall, and begins to think keeping it a secret may have been a bad idea. Jim gives Pam a tour of the house before showing her the garage, which he turned into an art studio. Noticing a seemingly disappointed look on Pam's face, and the fact that she has been quiet the entire tour, Jim acknowledges the house has problems and that it may have been presumptuous to buy it without telling her, but Pam is ecstatic that he bought her a house, and says she is happy with it so long as they do not have to sleep in his parents' old bedroom.

References

External links
"Frame Toby" at NBC.com

The Office (American season 5) episodes
2008 American television episodes
Television episodes written by Mindy Kaling